Abua (Abuan) is a  riverine kingdom which is currently located in the Abua–Odual LGA of Rivers State, Nigeria. It is located 10 miles away from Port Harcourt. The main occupation of resident of Abua includes: fishing, hunting and farming.

In Abua, the wet season is cold and overcast, while the drier season is mostly hot and sunny.

Origin of Abua LGA 
Researchers have utilized two Theories and phonetic investigations to reproduce the history of Abua and relocation throughout the long term. These theories are:

(I) The Delta Cross Movement

The Delta Cross Movement Theory

Customs relate the historical backdrop of Abua to the relocation or developments of the Delta Cross Speakers. Unmistakable among these scholars are the etymologists and college students of history like Murdock (1959), Nair (1972), Alagoa (1972), Williamson (1987), and Faraclas (1989).

The high point in this arrangement of custom is that given the language the Abuan's talk, individuals might have relocated from the Bantu heartland and moved downwards to where they right now possess through the eastern Niger delta. The practices of others with related dialects, the way of life of the Abua bunch and a correlation of the etymological connection between the focal delta gathering and her prompt neighbors support their view. A portion of these perspectives are introduced underneath:

In this theory, Nair recorded that Abua was among the seven Efut towns that outgrew the seven Efut settlements. The authors were thought by him to be a branch of the Bantu-talking people groups. These moved from the neighborhood of Usha Edit (Rio del Rey) in the Cameroon. They left their unique spot of home in a caravan of around seven boats and arrived at the Nigerian coastline.

Moreso, this proposal recommend that Abua moved from similar spot with precursors of the current day Efiks of the Cross Rivers state and that the gathering presumably shows up where they are presently in the late thirteenth century. This view is firmly upheld by similitudes in the numbering arrangement of Abua, Efik, and Ibibio. It is additionally upheld by some socio-political similitudes; Abua, Efik, and Ibibio among others have a place with the wide language bunch known as Delta Cross. Murdock recommends that these three ethnic gatherings – Ibibio, Efik, and Abua among others have a place with the Bantoid sub-gathering of the Nigritic family dependent on semantic proof. Likewise, about the Obolo (Andoni) which is additionally a Delta Cross talking local area, recommended that there was an overall development of the Delta Cross speakers from the upper ranges of the Cross waterway towards its mouth. The development might have arrived at the mouth of the waterway by around 300 B.C. As populace tensions build at the mouth of the Cross waterway, different gatherings of Delta Cross speakers began to search for new streams and rivers into which to grow. Toward the east, they ended up obstructed by a bunch of other Bantu-talking bunches who were themselves during the time spent extension; toward the west be that as it may, lay a region, what while not vacant, was all the more scantily populated. As needs be, a few rushes of transients went along the western brooks, some in the long run settling down either in the eastern Niger delta or somewhere else in the delta. As indicated by certain researchers, the focal delta gathering to which Abua has a place is probably the most punctual traveler among these Delta Cross speakers.

Notwithstanding, this practice holds that Abua, Odual, Kugbo, Ogbia among others here and there alluded to as Abua bunch, relocated from Rio del Ray in the Cameroon through the Cross waterway to the Niger delta. They settled among different spots close to the Obolo (Andoni), which was then the line among Nigeria and Cameroon.

The gathering stayed as their neighbor for at some point prior to clearing further toward the west into the core of the Niger delta. In Obolo, Abua had his first child, and named him Agana. In the wake of emptying from Obolo the gathering settled at Obomotu (present Port Harcourt) where they lived for at some point. Relics of their visit incorporate the name Obomotu (which means a major house) which is presently debased to Diobu and the presence of Abuloma. Undermined by war they left this area and wandered into the Bonny and later Brass streams and in conclusion into the Orashi River from where present settlements were made.

To start with, they moored at Otu Okoroma where Ogbia kicked the bucket and his two children Okoroma and Olei assumed liability for their heredity. Their relatives duplicated to shape the Ogbia people group.

The people remaining after the gathering continued on to Opumatubu and later to Arughunya and settled. There the Kugbo and Odual bunches settled however the Abua ancestry moved further to an area called Esidia Ozu and settled. Once settled, they found that the perpetual flooding at that area was a wellspring of annihilation to harvests and property, Abua and his kin then, at that point moved further north east to Olokpogha, which is the place where Abua lived with his gathering till his passing.

His posterity who establish individuals from the gathering spread to helpful spots where they resided with their youngsters in the neighborhood of Abua. These settlement places have become factions now. Subsequently we have Emughami, Okpadien, Otami, and Agana who were his quick children. Agana assumed control over the domain of his dad and his relatives abide in the focal home of Abua, which is all the more famously alluded to as Central Abua while different spots are named after different children who established the settlements.

List of communities and towns in Abua-Odual LGA 
The following are the names of communities and Towns in Abua listed alphabetically. 
 
Abada 
Abual 
Agada 
Akani 
Amalem 
Amaraka 
Amorota 
Aminigboko 
Anyu 
Arukwo 
Dibiriga 
Efebiri 
Egboama 
Egbolom 
Egbom 
Egunughan 
Ekunuga 
Elok 
Esidia Elok
Emago 
Emoh 
Emelesue 
Emelego 
Emesu 
Emilaghan 
Emirikpoko 
Emon-Ema Emabu 
Engeni 
Esala 
Esidia-Ogbema 
Forest-Reserve 
Iyak 
Kola-Ogbogbo 
Lower Orashi River
Opiada - Elok
Adokoni - Elok
Etuke - Elok
Akpasukubu - Elok 
Obarany 
Odaga 
Odedum 
Ogbema 
Ogbema Koku 
Ogbokuma 
Ogbologbo Plantain 
Ogboloma 
Oghora 
Okana 
Okoboh 
Okomade 
Okpedem 
Omokwa 
Opikiri 
Opu-Ogbogbo 
Oruama 
Otapha 
Otari 
Owerewere 
Plantains 
Serebia

References 

Populated places in Rivers State